Jason Norrish (born 26 January 1972) is an Australian rules footballer. Norrish played as a defensive midfielder and began his football career at the Claremont Tigers.

Early career
Norrish grew up in Bunbury where he attended Bunbury Cathedral Grammar School.   He represented WA in the State Schoolboys national championships before moving to Perth to attend Hale School. In 1990 he made his debut for Claremont and the following year played in the Tiger's premiership side. At the 1991 national draft he was taken by Melbourne with the 5th selection, with three other Claremont teammates selected before him. Norrish stayed at Claremont for the 1992 season, before moving to Melbourne in 1993.

Melbourne Demons
Norrish made his debut towards the end of the 1993 season and played in five of their last nine games. The following year he missed the first seven games, before playing in most of the remaining games, including all three finals.

Fremantle Dockers
With the introduction of the Fremantle Dockers to the AFL, coached by Norrish's Claremont premiership coach Gerard Neesham, he was targeted as a priority signing. He returned as an uncontracted player and Melbourne were able to select Don Cockatoo-Collins as compensation. Hampered by injury in his first three seasons at the new club, including a groin injury in 1997, he played all 22 games in 1998 and won named the club champion by one vote from Adrian Fletcher. He claimed it was an award that recognised that he was 'just doing his job properly'. His reputation and standing amongst the team was recognised in 1999 when he was named as a vice-captain, a position he held through to the 2001 season. In 2001 he became the third player to play 100 games for Fremantle.

Following his retirement from AFL in 2002, he returned to Claremont and played for a further season before work commitments resulted in his retirement from all league football. In total he played 66 games for Claremont, 20 for Melbourne, 128 for Fremantle and one state game for Western Australia. He was inducted into the WA Two Hundred Club in 2003.

References

External links

Fremantle Football Club profile

1972 births
Claremont Football Club players
Fremantle Football Club players
Doig Medal winners
Living people
Melbourne Football Club players
People from Bunbury, Western Australia
People educated at Hale School
Australian rules footballers from Western Australia